is a Japanese national highway connecting the cities of Kuji and Ninohe. The  highway begins at Kuji Interchange where it meets National Route 45, the Sanriku-kita Jūkan Road, and the Hachinohe-Kuji Expressway in Kuji. It travels northwest across the northeastern corner of Iwate Prefecture to Ninohe where it ends at an intersection with National Route 4.

History
What would become National Route 395 was originally established as the Kuji–Fukuoka Route, a major prefectural road, in 1954 by the Ministry of Construction, a predecessor to the Ministry of Land, Infrastructure, Transport and Tourism. The Kuji–Fukuoka Route was upgraded to National Route 395 on 1 April 1982.

List of major junctions 
The route lies entirely within Iwate Prefecture.

References

External links 
 

National highways in Japan
Roads in Iwate Prefecture